Dublin is a constituency of the European Parliament in Ireland. It elects 4 Members of the European Parliament (MEPs) using proportional representation by means of the single transferable vote (STV).

History and boundaries
The constituency was created in 1979 for the first direct elections to the European Parliament. From 1979 to 1994, it comprised County Dublin and the city of Dublin. Since 1994 it comprises the same area redefined as the counties of Dún Laoghaire–Rathdown, Fingal, South Dublin and the city of Dublin.

From 1979 to 2004, it elected 4 MEPs; this was reduced to 3 for the 2009 election. For the 2019 European Parliament election, a reapportionment following Brexit and the loss of 73 MEPs from the United Kingdom gave two additional seats to Ireland. Following a recommendation of the Constituency Commission, Dublin gained an extra seat, from 3 to 4. However, the last candidate elected did not take his seat until after the United Kingdom withdrew from the European Union.

MEPs

Elections

2019 election

The count was suspended overnight after count 14 to clarify whether Lynn Boylan's votes should be redistributed between the two continuing candidates, Barry Andrews and Clare Daly. The usual count rules had been amended so the practice of deeming candidates elected without reaching the quota would not apply. This gives a more precise ordering between the final candidates to be elected, which is important in 2019 because the last candidate elected could not take their seat until the reallocation of seats in the European Parliament which took place when Brexit had taken effect and the MEPs elected for the United Kingdom vacated their seats on 31 January 2020.

2014 election

2009 election

For the 2009 election, the constituency was reduced from 4 seats to 3.

2004 election

1999 election

1994 election

1989 election

1984 election

1979 election

See also

European Parliament constituencies in the Republic of Ireland

Notes

References

External links
Dublin MEPs – European Parliament Office in Ireland
Irish MEPs 1973-2019, European Parliament Liaison Office in Ireland

1979 establishments in Ireland
Constituencies established in 1979
European Parliament constituencies in the Republic of Ireland
Politics of County Dublin